Shaun McNally (born December 10, 1957, Derby, Connecticut) is an American activist and former Connecticut state legislator. He served in the Connecticut House of Representatives from 1987–1992, representing Norwich and Sprague.

During his service in the state legislature, McNally served as House Chair the Planning and Development Committee.  He also served as a member of the Finance, Commerce, Judiciary and Human Services committees.

Connecticut Public Service Career
McNally was staff member for former U.S. Representative Sam Gejdenson, from 1981–82, and staff on the Chris Dodd Senate campaign in 1980. In 2004, he ran unsuccessfully for Congress.

From 1995-2003, he was director of public affairs and chief internet strategist for the Connecticut Business and Industry Association (CBIA), where he was responsible for small business and manufacturing sector public policy agenda development as well as member legislative advocacy. From 2008-09, McNally served as executive director of the Connecticut Early Childhood Alliance, a coalition of organizations advocating for high-quality early childhood education.

International Democracy and Governance Work
After an unsuccessful campaign for the democratic nomination for US Congress CT-2, in 2005 McNally joined the USAID Mission in Iraq as Food Security Advisor for the Food for Peace Program.  McNally later returned to Iraq as technical advisor and Deputy Chief of Party for the Local Governance Program (LGP3) (2009-2011) and later as technical advisor for the USAID-funded Government Strengthening Program (GSP) (2012-2013).

Currently, McNally serves as Chief of Party for the USAID Strengthening Somali Governance (SSG) program.  From 2013-15, he led a parliamentary strengthening program in Armenia (SANAP). From 2011-12, he served as Chief of Party for the USAID/Afghanistan local governance strengthening program for the nine provinces of ISAF-North (RAMP-UP).   From 2006-07, McNally was Country Director and Chief of Party for the National Democratic Institute for International Affairs (NDI) democracy and governance programs for Albania.  The program worked with civil society groups, political parties, journalists, mayors and members of parliament, as well as supporting election monitoring.

Personal life/Education
McNally holds a B.A in political science from the University of Connecticut and a Master of Public Administration degree from Harvard University's John F. Kennedy School of Government. 

McNally has one daughter.

References

Democratic Party members of the Connecticut House of Representatives
Peace Corps volunteers
University of Connecticut alumni
Harvard Kennedy School alumni
Living people
1957 births